Franz A. "Jazz" Byrd (c. 1904 – December 9, 1994) was an American football player and coach and Internal Revenue Service (IRS) employee. He served as the head football coach at Florida A&M University from 1926 to 1929, compiling a record of 3–13–2.

College playing career
Byrd played college football at Lincoln University in Chester County, Pennsylvania, helping the Lions to an 8–0–1 record in 1924 in which they outscored their opponents 306–3.

College coaching career
He served as the head football coach at Florida A&M University from 1926 to 1929.

Later life
Byrd was employed by the Internal Revenue Service (IRS), before being named the first African American state income tax collector.  He died at the age of 90, on December 9, 1994, at Riverside Extended Pavilion Care in Wilmington, Delaware.

Head coaching record

References

Year of birth missing
1994 deaths
American football running backs
Guards (basketball)
Florida A&M Rattlers and Lady Rattlers athletic directors
Florida A&M Rattlers football coaches
Lincoln Lions football players
Lincoln Lions men's basketball players
Lincoln Lions men's track and field athletes
African-American coaches of American football
African-American players of American football
African-American basketball players
African-American male track and field athletes
African-American college athletic directors in the United States
20th-century African-American sportspeople